The year 592 BC was a year of the pre-Julian Roman calendar. In the Roman Empire, it was known as year 162 Ab urbe condita . The denomination 592 BC for this year has been used since the early medieval period, when the Anno Domini calendar era became the prevalent method in Europe for naming years.

Events
 An Egyptian force sacks Napata, compelling the Cushite court to move to a safer location at Meroë near the Nile's sixth cataract.

Births

Deaths

References